"Chandelier" is a song by Australian singer and songwriter Sia, from her sixth studio album, 1000 Forms of Fear (2014). Written by Sia and Jesse Shatkin and produced by Shatkin and Greg Kurstin, the song was released on 17 March 2014 as the lead single from the album. It is an electropop song, featuring electronica, R&B and reggae influences. Lyrically, the song has a melancholic theme, detailing the demoralisation and rationalisation of alcoholism through the thought process of a "party girl".  More broadly, the song speaks to the fleeting feelings of release and abandon that come with intoxication, as well as the pain, guilt and emptiness that accompany addiction, alcoholism and hedonistic excess.

The single received critical acclaim and reached the top 5 on record charts in 20 countries including France, Italy, Poland, Norway, Australia and New Zealand. In the United States, the single peaked at number 8 on the Billboard Hot 100, becoming Sia's first single as a lead artist to appear on the Hot 100, and has sold over 2 million copies in the country. The song received 4 nominations at the 57th Annual Grammy Awards for Song of the Year, Record of the Year and Best Pop Solo Performance, with its video receiving a nomination for Best Music Video.

A music video for the song, directed by Sia and Daniel Askill, and choreographed by Ryan Heffington, features US dancer Maddie Ziegler. It has been viewed on YouTube more than 2.5 billion times. In support of the single and 1000 Forms of Fear, Sia, often with Ziegler, performed "Chandelier" on a number of US television shows, including The Ellen DeGeneres Show, Late Night with Seth Meyers, Jimmy Kimmel Live!, Saturday Night Live, Dancing With the Stars, and at the 57th Grammy Awards.

Background
In 2010, Sia released her fifth studio album We Are Born, which ended up at number two on the Australian Albums Chart. Following the release, Sia took a hiatus from performing and co-wrote songs for other recording artists, including Beyoncé, Rihanna, Christina Aguilera, Flo Rida and David Guetta. In 2013, Sia recorded the track "Elastic Heart" for The Hunger Games: Catching Fire soundtrack.

In May 2014, Sia announced her sixth studio album 1000 Forms of Fear and released "Chandelier" as its lead single. Sia revealed that she initially wrote the track for Rihanna or Beyoncé, but decided to record the song herself. The melody and chords were formed following a jam session in the studio featuring Sia on the piano and Jesse Shatkin playing a marimba. In the United States, "Chandelier" was released for digital download onto iTunes Stores on 17 March 2014 through Monkey Puzzle, with distribution by RCA Records. In the United Kingdom, "Chandelier" was released digitally on 29 June 2014. A day later, it was sent by RCA Records to US hot adult contemporary radio.

Composition

"Chandelier" was written by Sia and Shatkin and was produced by Kurstin and Shatkin. It was described as an electropop ballad, featuring "soaring" synthesisers, "militant" drums, and hip hop beats with electronica, R&B, and reggae influences. The song features Sia's "jaw-dropping" vocal performance. The song is written in the key of B minor and it follows the chord progression of Bbm–Gbmaj7–Ab–Fm in the verses, Gbmaj7–Bbm-Ab in the pre-chorus, and Gbmaj7–Ab–Db/F–Gbmaj7 in the chorus. The acoustic version is recorded in G minor. The song's BPM is 90.

Lyrically, "Chandelier" has a sad theme talking about "the glitter and fatigue of a party girl's life". John Walker from MTV Buzzworthy opined that the song has a dark theme, "toeing the line between celebration and self-destruction as it becomes increasingly more blurred". The song's opening lyrics, "Party girls don't get hurt, can't feel anything ... I push it down", are sung over a reggae-influenced background. Walker noted that during the chorus, Sia sings, "I'm gonna swing from the chandelier, from the chandelier/ I'm gonna live like tomorrow doesn't exist, like it doesn't exist". A few critics, including Jeremy Gordon from Pitchfork Media, and Melinda Newman of HitFix, compared the song's musical style to works done by Rihanna.

Critical reception
"Chandelier" has received critical acclaim. Andrew Trendall from Gigwise wrote that the song "springboards Sia from a behind-the-scenes genius into a superstar in her own right". Gordon from Pitchfork praised Sia's vocal performance on the track and commented that the track "is enough to make you want to swing from a chandelier". Bradley Stern from the website MuuMuse labelled "Chandelier" the best pop single of 2014, complimenting Sia's songwriting credits and her voice on the song. In a VH1 article, Emily Exton shared that thought, deeming it the best song Sia had ever written. Writing for Time magazine, Jamieson Cox deemed "Chandelier" a "disarming, unforgettable listen that'll make you glad Sia kept this one for herself." Maura Johnston of Spin wrote "Chandelier,” the opener of 1000 Forms of Fear, has a thudding beat similar to “Diamonds” but more importantly Furler's voice curls around each syllable, rendering some of the lyrics nearly unrecognizable as discreet words." In a less enthusiastic review, Melinda Newman from HitFix thought that Sia "can do a lot better than this". Hugh Montgomery of The Independent noticed the song's "segue from reggae verse to sockingly melodramatic, wind-machine-worthy chorus."

Billboard listed "Chandelier" as the best song of 2014. The song received nominations at the 57th Grammy Awards for Song of the Year, Record of the Year and Best Pop Solo Performance, with its video receiving a nomination for Best Music Video.

Year-end lists

Commercial performance
In the United States, "Chandelier" debuted at number 75 on the US Billboard Hot 100 chart dated 31 May 2014. It peaked at number eight on the chart, becoming the first top ten single by Sia to appear on the chart as a lead artist. The song reached one million units sold in the US in August 2014, and surpassed the 2 million mark in sales in January 2015. The song also reached number six on the Canadian Hot 100. In June 2014, the single was certified platinum by Music Canada. "Chandelier" was successful in Oceania and Europe, peaking in the top five on 20 national record charts including: France, and Poland  (number one); Australia, Italy and Norway (number two); New Zealand and Slovakia (number three); and Norway and Scotland (number five). The single was certified quadruple platinum by the Australian Recording Industry Association (ARIA), and platinum by the Recorded Music NZ (RMNZ). In the United Kingdom, "Chandelier" charted at number six on the UK Singles Chart. In France, the single was the third best-selling single of 2014, according to Syndicat National de l'Édition Phonographique.

Music video

The music video for "Chandelier" was released on 6 May 2014, featuring then-11-year-old dancer Maddie Ziegler. In the video, Ziegler wears a medium-length blonde wig matching the one that Sia used to promote the album. Throughout the video, Ziegler performs an interpretive dance in a deserted, dirty apartment "while spinning, kicking, leaping, crawling, falling, twirling and hiding herself behind window drapes". An alternative one-take version of the clip was released in June 2014. Sia had seen Ziegler on Dance Moms and asked her to appear in the video via Twitter. The video was directed by Sia and Daniel Askill, shot by cinematographer Sebastian Winterø and was choreographed by Ryan Heffington. Ziegler shared her thoughts about the choreography with New York magazine:

I like the whole dance. It was really different and weird for me, because I usually don't, you know, be a crazy person every time. It was so fun to do and it was really out of the box and it expanded me a lot, because I'm used to competition dances where you're like, "Point your legs!" But this time it was like, you just need to let go and feel it.

The choreography was praised by media outlets; an editor from The Guardian wrote that Ziegler "dances with such impressive flexibility". Nolan Feenay from Time magazine commented that the dance moves in the video could be the best dance routine of 2014. 

"Chandelier" won the ARIA Award for Best Video at the ARIA Music Awards of 2014. "Chandelier" received nominations at the MTV Video Music Awards for Video of the Year and Best Choreography, and ultimately won the latter. It was also nominated for a 2015 Grammy Award for Best Music Video. The video went viral on YouTube and became the seventh most-watched video on the video-sharing website of 2014. As of May 2022, it has received over 2.5 billion views and was, at one point, the 13th most viewed YouTube video of all time. It has since moved down to being outside the top 40 most viewed YouTube videos of all time. As of January 2015, Billboard ranked the video at number 12 on the list of the 20 best of the 2010s (so far). Both Rolling Stone magazine and Spin magazine named it the Best Music Video of 2014. VH1 listed it first among the "most groundbreaking" videos of 2014. In 2016, several items related to the "Chandelier" video were introduced into the "Right Here, Right Now" exhibit of the Rock and Roll Hall of Fame. In 2018, Billboard ranked the video the 18th best music video of the 21st century.

Live performances
Sia performed "Chandelier" on The Ellen DeGeneres Show on 19 May 2014, with Ziegler recreating the choreography in the music video. Sia also performed the song on Late Night with Seth Meyers on 9 June 2014, with Girls star Lena Dunham performing new choreography. In July 2014, Sia performed the song on Jimmy Kimmel Live!, and Ziegler taught host Jimmy Kimmel and his sidekick Guillermo some of the dance moves from the music video. In July 2014, Sia performed the song on the VH1's show "SoundClash", along with her songs "Elastic Heart" and "Big Girls Cry" from the album. Sia sang the song on Dancing with the Stars, with Ziegler dancing a duet with Allison Holker, and at the 2014 We Can Survive Concert at the Hollywood Bowl. In February 2015, Sia sang the song in a cluttered apartment set for the 2015 Grammy Awards telecast, with Ziegler dancing with actress Kristen Wiig. For all of these performances, Sia sang the track with her back to the camera. She performed the song on Saturday Night Live in January 2015, veiled, with a sad-looking mime who performed the lyrics in ASL.

Covers and uses in media

In July 2014, Sara Bareilles performed an acoustic version of "Chandelier" during her Little Black Dress Tour. Reut Odinak from the Seattle Weekly lauded Bareilles' vocals on the cover. Likewise, MuchMusic's Evan Desouza wrote that "The song sounds almost [unrecognisable] with the stripped, acoustic cover. Of course no one can match Sia's insane voice, but Sara does a decent job. Her vocals sound amazing."

The song was covered on BBC Radio 1's Live Lounge in September 2014 by Irish band The Script; Music and Lyrics praised the lgroup's three-man harmonies. In November 2014, Loïc Nottet a Belgian hopeful for the Eurovision Song Contest released a cover of the song on YouTube in November 2014, later praised by Sia on Twitter.

Television shows
 Selfie (2014) - Karen Gillan's character, Eliza Dooley, sang "Chandelier" and The Wind and The Wave's cover of the song was also featured
 Killing Eve (2018) - The song was performed by Sandra Oh as Eve Polastri
 Emily in Paris (2020) - The character Mindy Chen played by Ashley Park sang the song

Track listing
Digital download
"Chandelier" – 3:36

Digital download – Remixes EP
"Chandelier" (Four Tet Remix) – 4:31
"Chandelier" (Plastic Plates Remix) – 4:27
"Chandelier" (Cutmore Club Remix) – 5:08
"Chandelier" (Hector Fonseca Remix) – 6:27
"Chandelier" (Liam Keegan Remix) – 5:16
"Chandelier" (Dev Hynes Remix) – 3:44

Credits and personnel
Credits for "Chandelier" are adapted from CD single liner notes
Recording locations
Vocals recorded at Hot Closet Studios, Echo Park, California
Engineered at Echo Studios, Los Angeles, California
Mixed at Larrabee Sound Studios, North Hollywood, California

Personnel

Songwriter, Lead vocals – Sia Furler
Songwriter – Jesse Shatkin
Producers – Greg Kurstin, Jesse Shatkin
Drums, guitar, mellotron, piano – Greg Kurstin
Drums, keyboards – Jesse Shatkin
Programming – Jesse Shatkin
Engineering – Greg Kurstin, Jesse Shatkin
Additional engineering – Alex Pasco, Delbert Bowers
Mixing – Manny Marroquin
Assistant mixing – Chris Galland, Delbert Bowers

Charts

Weekly charts

Decade-end charts

Year-end charts

Certifications

Release history

See also
 Billboard Year-End Hot 100 singles of 2014
 List of best-selling singles in Australia
 List of Billboard Dance Club Songs number ones of 2014
 List of Billboard Hot 100 top-ten singles in 2014
 List of most-streamed songs on Spotify
 List of number-one dance singles of 2014 (U.S.)
 List of number-one hits of 2014 (France)
 List of number-one singles of 2014 (Poland)
 List of top 10 singles in 2014 (Australia)
 List of top 10 singles in 2014 (France)
 List of top 25 singles for 2014 in Australia
 List of top 100 singles of 2014 (France)
 List of UK top-ten singles in 2014
 New Zealand top 50 singles of 2014
 Triple J Hottest 100, 2014

References

External links
 
 
 
 Lyrics of Chandelier

2014 songs
2014 singles
APRA Award winners
Electropop songs
Music videos directed by Daniel Askill
Number-one singles in Greece
Number-one singles in Israel
Number-one singles in Poland
RCA Records singles
Sia (musician) songs
SNEP Top Singles number-one singles
Song recordings produced by Greg Kurstin
Song recordings produced by Jesse Shatkin
Songs about alcohol
Songs about drugs
Songs about depression
Songs about suicide
Songs written by Jesse Shatkin
Songs written by Sia (musician)